Steven Joseph Blaisse (7 May 1940 – 20 April 2001) was a Dutch rower who had his best achievements in the coxless pairs event, together with Ernst Veenemans. Together they won silver medals at the 1964 Summer Olympics, gold medals at the 1964 European Championships and bronze medals at the 1961 European Championships.

Blaisse was a nephew of Olympic skater Ben Blaisse.

References

External links

 

1940 births
2001 deaths
Dutch male rowers
Olympic rowers of the Netherlands
Rowers at the 1960 Summer Olympics
Rowers at the 1964 Summer Olympics
Olympic silver medalists for the Netherlands
Rowers from Amsterdam
Olympic medalists in rowing
Medalists at the 1964 Summer Olympics
European Rowing Championships medalists
20th-century Dutch people
21st-century Dutch people